Erik Rhodes may refer to:
 Erik Rhodes (actor, born 1906) (1906–1990), American actor and Broadway singer
 Erik Rhodes (pornographic actor) (1982–2012), American gay pornographic film actor